Slađana Bulatović (born 4 May 1994) is a Montenegrin professional footballer who plays as a forward for Japanese club MyNavi Sendai playing in the WE League and the Montenegro national team, where she serves as its captain.

She was declared as the best goal scorer in Hungarian football league 2015–2016.

International goals

References

External links 

Profile at Txapeldunak.com 

1994 births
Living people
Women's association football forwards
Montenegrin women's footballers
Footballers from Nikšić
Montenegro women's international footballers
ŽFK Mašinac PZP Niš players
Ferencvárosi TC (women) footballers
Primera División (women) players
Fundación Albacete players
Rayo Vallecano Femenino players
Mynavi Vegalta Sendai Ladies players
Montenegrin expatriate footballers
Montenegrin expatriate sportspeople in Serbia
Expatriate women's footballers in Serbia
Montenegrin expatriate sportspeople in Bosnia and Herzegovina
Expatriate women's footballers in Bosnia and Herzegovina
Montenegrin expatriate sportspeople in Hungary
Expatriate women's footballers in Hungary
Montenegrin expatriate sportspeople in Spain
Expatriate women's footballers in Spain
ŽFK Ekonomist players